Danielle Spencer is an American actress and former child star best known for her role as Dee Thomas on the ABC sitcom What's Happening!!, which ran from 1976 until 1979. She would later reprise the role on the series' sequel, What's Happening Now!!

Life and career
Spencer was born in Trenton, New Jersey to writer Cheryl Pelt, who separated from her husband when Spencer was very young. Spencer considered her mother's next husband, Tim Pelt, to be her father. The family relocated to the Bronx, New York. Spencer became an actor around the age of eight and began taking acting classes. In 1976, Spencer was cast as younger sister Dee Thomas on the show What's Happening!!, which was loosely based on the film Cooley High. The show was a summer mid-season replacement, but performed so well in its time slot that a full second season was ordered.

On September 7, 1977, during the second season of the show, Spencer and her stepfather Tim Pelt were involved a severe car accident that left Spencer in a coma for three weeks and caused Pelt's death.  Pelt's fatal injuries were caused by trying to protect Spencer during the crash. Spencer has no memories of the accident and spent six months recuperating in arm and leg casts.

After the cancellation of the show in 1979, Spencer and her mother relocated to Africa for a time. Upon her return, she attended the University of California-Davis to earn a degree in veterinary medicine, a pursuit that was encouraged by her late stepfather. As syndicated reruns of the 65 What's Happening!! episodes had done well, in some markets eclipsing the show's ratings during its network run, in 1985 a sequel series was created called What's Happening Now!!. Spencer played Dee in various episodes over the sequel's three-season run while attending college. While in her sophomore year, she pledged and became a member of Delta Sigma Theta sorority. After What's Happening Now!! was canceled in 1988, Spencer attended Tuskegee University Veterinary School in Tuskegee, Alabama. She became a veterinarian in 1996.
 
Spencer considers herself to be in semi-retirement from show business, but still acts occasionally. In 1997, she portrayed a veterinarian in the hit film As Good as It Gets and appeared in Peter Rabbit and the Crucifix in 2001. She continues to act in small roles in film and television when it does not conflict with her veterinary practice.

The cast of What's Happening!! was honored at the 2006 TV Land Awards, where Spencer was the co-winner (along with Little House on the Prairie actress Alison Arngrim) of the "Character Most in Need of a Time-Out" award.

Spencer released a book about her life as a child star entitled Through the Fire: Journal of a Child Star. The book led to renewed interest in Spencer's life and career, and led to appearances on shows such as The Wendy Williams Show, TV One's hit series Life After and Unsung Hollywood with her former cast members.

Personal life

Spencer married Garry Fields, a marketing manager and her publicist and manager, in Marina Del Rey, California in 1999. The couple divorced in 2013.

In 2004, Spencer experienced balance and chronic pain issues and was diagnosed with spinal stenosis as a result of the injuries from her 1977 car accident. A surgery to correct the problem left her partially paralyzed for eight months. Spencer received treatment at the Kessler Institute for Rehabilitation in New Jersey; she credits the institute for giving her life back to her.

Spencer has been a veterinarian in California for more than 25 years. In an interview with People, Spencer credited her own battle with spinal injury and paralysis for changing her perspective on the treatment of animals from simply alleviating their pain to finding the underlying cause of their problems.

In 2014, Spencer was inducted as part of the permanent exhibition of the new National Museum of African American History and Culture. She is the only former child actor who holds this honor. She also became involved in fashion design and debuted her "Dani Collection" line, which was patterned after her own style of dress.

Spencer was diagnosed with breast cancer in September 2014. Speaking out for Breast Cancer Awareness Month, Spencer told Black America Web that her diagnosis took her by surprise. "With everything that I've been through with the spinal cord injury, I said I know God is not going to give me another affliction," she said, "so I was completely shocked when the doctors told me." Though the news came as a surprise, Spencer said the disease runs in her family. "I have a lot of help and support around me," she said. Spencer stated that she was considering her treatment options, with surgery at the top of the list. "I'm trying to get as many opinions as possible but it does look like that is what I'm going to do," she said. "Hopefully after that there won't be any chemotherapy or radiation involved."

Spencer makes appearances as a motivational speaker. She told Ebony Magazine in 2012, "I've made peace with the fact that surgeries, back pain and walking with crutches will be part of my life forever. Some days are good, some days are difficult. Yet, despite the challenges, there are reasons to celebrate. My life includes volunteering with a charity that feeds the homeless; providing care for animals through my work as a vet."

Filmography

Film

Television

References

External links
 
 

20th-century American actresses
21st-century American actresses
Actors from Trenton, New Jersey
Actresses from New Jersey
African-American actresses
American child actresses
American film actresses
American television actresses
American veterinarians
Living people
Tuskegee University alumni
University of California, Davis alumni
Women veterinarians
20th-century African-American women
20th-century African-American people
21st-century African-American women
21st-century African-American people
Year of birth missing (living people)